Catherine Bishop may refer to:
 Catherine Bishop, British rower
 Catherine Bishop, New Zealand-born historian